Barbu Solacolu (March 18, 1897 – October 30, 1976) was a Romanian poet, translator, civil servant and social scientist. A late affiliate of the Symbolist movement, he brought to it his leftist sympathies and agrarianism. He was a decorated cavalry commander in World War I, then a prominent civil servant and leading member of the Agrarian Union Party, noted in local academia for his essays on Revisionist Marxism. During World War II, he presided upon the National Association of Chemical Industries. In old age, Solacolu was primarily a memorist and translator from William Shakespeare.

Biography

Early life and career
Born in Bucharest, Barbu was the son of Victor Solacolu, a magistrate, and Victoria (née Petrescu), daughter of military doctor (and Romanian Land Forces General) Zaharia Petrescu. Before marrying Solacolu, Victoria had been his secretary; her sister, Alina, was the wife of zoologist Grigore Antipa. Victor was the scion of a prosperous merchant family, of Bulgarian heritage. From his grandfather Hagi-Anghel Grigore (of Solacoglu Inn fame), and his father, Dimitrie Solacolu, he had inherited the Hanul cu Tei business and a large estate in Sărulești. Victor's brother, Theodor Solacolu, a noted botanist, was also a Symbolist author, as was (occasionally) his other brother, Alfred. Other relatives include chemist Șerban C. Solacolu, engineer Paul Solacolu, and publicist Ion Solacolu.

Barbu, who was the Victor and Victoria's second son (his elder, Fernand, had been born in Belgium), attended primary school from 1904 to 1908; between 1908 and 1913, he studied at Gheorghe Lazăr and Saint Sava high schools. He made his pseudonymous debut (as "Barsol" and "Falstaff") in the 1911 editions of the Symbolist review Versuri și Proză, his work also taken up in Sărbătoarea Eroilor, in Ovid Densusianu's Vieața Nouă, and in N. D. Cocea's Rampa and Facla. He was also published, with his full name, by Constantin Banu's Flacăra in 1912. In collaboration with Al. Westfried, he translated and published from Maeterlinck's Serres chaudes. His own youth poetry was a mixture of mainline Symbolism and decadent writing.

From 1913 to 1915, Solacolu completed two years of studies at the University of Bucharest's law faculty. During those years, with Romania still neutral in what became World War I, Solacolu was marginally involved with the literary-political circles of Alexandru Bogdan-Pitești and Ioan Slavici, which were supportive of the Central Powers. Decades later, he confessed to having purposefully stayed away from controversy, only publishing neutral literature in Slavici's Ziua; he also recalled seeing a passive Slavici taking orders from Bogdan-Pitești, the alleged spy. Solacolu was drafted into the Land Forces, upon Romania's entry into war. Part of his family remained in Bucharest, which soon fell to the Germans. Barbu followed the army on its northeastern retreat, went to the Iași military school, and eventually participated in the Budapest Campaign as a second lieutenant in the cavalry. He received the Military Virtue Medal and was an Officer of the Order of the Crown.

The war did not interrupt his literary work, with samples taken up by Convorbiri Literare in 1915, and by Letopiseți in 1918–1919. In 1920, Solacolu issued the poetry volume Umbre pe drumuri ("Shadows on the Roads"), bridging Symbolism with proletarian sympathies. This was followed in 1922 by a brochure on Fyodor Dostoyevsky, which was noted as a poetic commentary and introduction to that writer's style and themes. Solacolu became an editor at Nicolae Iorga's Neamul Românesc in 1923, while also being hosted in Ion Vinea's Contimporanul. In 1924, he made his second appearance in Convorbiri Literare, contributing to the magazines Vieața Nouă, Sburătorul, and Cuvântul Liber.

Theoretician, bureaucrat, and later life
He continued his studies at the University of Berlin from 1920 to 1923, earning doctorates in philosophy and economic sciences in the latter year. His professors included Werner Sombart, Heinrich Herkner and Alois Riehl. A public auditor at the Ministry of Justice from 1925, and an honorific associate professor at the Academy of Higher-level Commercial Studies, he was also active in Dimitrie Gusti's Social Institute. Furthermore, Solacolu held positions in the economic and administrative bureaucracy of Greater Romania, including economic adviser to the ministries of Foreign Affairs and Finance, and commissioner at the National Credit Union.

Solacolu was also becoming known as a social and political thinker. In 1925, with an article in Țara de Jos, he supported regionalism as an organic and natural setting for national life. That year, he traveled to Vălenii de Munte and held a seminary on "Marxism" at Iorga's "summer university". A contributor to Gusti's Arhiva pentru Știință și Reformă Socială, he was quoted for his 1929 critical study of Henri de Man and Marxian Revisionism. Before October 1932, Solacolu had joined the Constantin Argetoianu-led Agrarian Union Party, putting out its newspaper, Pământul Nostru. In December 1938, he became a secretary of the General Union of Romanian Industrialists. By then, he was publicizing his own ideas about the crisis of capitalism, which, he argued, had been rendered inevitable by monopolistic tendencies and the Great Depression.

During 1941, with Romania as an ally of Nazi Germany, Solacolu was appointed head of the National Association of Chemical Industries (ANIC), which delivered for the German war industry. In 1942, he published a German-language treatise on Romania's economy, Das neue Rumänien im Werden ("New Romania in the Making"). Following the August 1944 Coup, when Romania went over to the Allies, Solacolu was kept on the new administrative bodies. In early 1945, still representing ANIC, he joined a Coordinating Committee which provided supplies for the transiting Red Army. By the end of the year, however, the Propaganda Ministry pulled Das neue Rumänien im Werden from the bookshops, singling it out as "detrimental to the good relationship between Romania and the United Nations." In 1946, the Romanian Communist Party denounced Solacolu as the ringleader of a "Hitlerite association", and alleged that he was responsible for the nationwide shortages of soap. His uncle Theodor, who worked for the Romanian Legation in Vatican City, had a publicized dispute with the communist leadership, and defected in early 1948. He spent his later life in Buenos Aires.

Solacolu survived the establishment of Romania's communist regime, and later returned to more favor. From the late 1950s, he was mainly active as a translator, from Shakespeare, but also from Pierre de Ronsard, Giosuè Carducci, William Styron (The Long March), Cyprian Ekwensi (Burning Grass), and Elizabeth Barrett Browning (Sonnets from the Portuguese). In 1968, he reissued Umbre pe drumuri in expanded form. During the early 1970s, he was a steady contributor to Viața Românească, using the pen names "B. S.", "S. B.", and "S. Barbu", publishing recollections of literary life in Secolul 20 and România Literară. His full memoirs appeared as Evocări. Confesiuni. Portrete (Cartea Românească, 1974), and in large part focused on tracing his family's long history. In 1976, the year of Solacolu's death, Timișoara National Theater was using his translation for a staging of Shakespeare's Henry VI, Part 3. In 1978, Dorin Tudoran issued a book of interviews, which contained some of Solacolu's thoughts on the literary reconsideration of three fin de siècle writers: D. Iacobescu, Donar Munteanu, Constantin Sandu-Aldea.

Notes

References
Politics and Political Parties in Roumania. London: International Reference Library Publishers Co., 1936. 
Paul Cernat, Avangarda românească și complexul periferiei: primul val. Bucharest: Cartea Românească, 2007. 
Iorgu Petrescu, "General prof. Zaharia Petrescu și familia sa", Noema. Comitetul Român de Istoria și Filosofia Știinţei și Tehnicii, Vol. X, 2011, pp. 561–575.

1897 births
1976 deaths
Romanian economists
Romanian industrialists
20th-century essayists
Romanian essayists
20th-century Romanian poets
Romanian male poets
Symbolist poets
Decadent literature
Romanian literary critics
Romanian translators
20th-century translators
English–Romanian translators
French–Romanian translators
Translators of William Shakespeare
Romanian magazine editors
Romanian newspaper editors
Contimporanul writers
Romanian agrarianists
Romanian activist journalists
20th-century memoirists
Romanian memoirists
Romanian civil servants
Writers from Bucharest
Romanian people of Bulgarian descent
Saint Sava National College alumni
Humboldt University of Berlin alumni
Academic staff of the Bucharest Academy of Economic Studies
Cavalry commanders
Romanian Land Forces officers
Romanian military personnel of World War I
Romanian people of the Hungarian–Romanian War
Romanian people of World War II
Recipients of the Military Virtue Medal
Officers of the Order of the Crown (Romania)